The Boston mayoral election of 1886 saw the reelection of Hugh O'Brien to a third consecutive term.

Results

See also
List of mayors of Boston, Massachusetts

References

Mayoral elections in Boston
Boston
Boston mayoral
19th century in Boston